Euryalidae is a family of echinoderms belonging to the order Euryalida.

Genera

Genera:
 Asteromorpha Lütken, 1869
 Asteroschema Örsted & Lütken, 1856
 Asterostegus Mortensen, 1933
 Astrobrachion Doederlein, 1927
 Astroceras Lyman, 1879
 Astrocharis Koehler, 1904
 Euryale Lamarck, 1816
 Ophiocreas Lyman, 1879
 Squamophis Okanishi, O'Hara & Fujita, 2011
 Sthenocephalus Koehler, 1898
 Trichaster L. Agassiz, 1836

References

 
Echinoderm families
Phrynophiurida